Jannat-e Mortazavi (also Romanized as Jannat-e Mortaz̤avī; also known as Jannat and Jannatābād) is a village in Ferdows Rural District, Ferdows District, Rafsanjan County, Kerman Province, Iran. At the 2006 census, its population was 163, in 41 families.

References 

Populated places in Rafsanjan County